The 2003 Windsor and Maidenhead Borough Council election took place on 1 May 2003 to elect members of Windsor and Maidenhead Unitary Council in Berkshire, England. The whole council was up for election with boundary changes since the last election in 2000 reducing the number of seats by 1. The Liberal Democrats gained overall control of the council from no overall control.

Campaign
Windsor and Maidenhead council was a top target for the Liberal Democrats in the 2003 local elections. The party had come close to taking the Maidenhead parliamentary constituency at the last general election in 2001 and were optimistic of taking control of the council. The Liberal Democrats were expected to benefit from the support of the estimated 3,000 Muslims who lived in the council area due to the party's opposition to the Iraq War. The issue of a proposed extension to a local mosque was also used for the Liberal Democrats, but the Conservatives accused them of pandering to the Muslim community.

The council had been controlled by the Conservatives since the 2000 election in an alliance with 2 of the independent councillors. However the Liberal Democrats attacked the council for having raised council tax by 9.3% in the last year and by 20% over the 3 years since the last election. They also criticised the council for its plans to demolish the town hall and pointed to a weak rating for the council by the Audit Commission. However the Conservatives said Windsor and Maidenhead's council tax was still one of the lowest in the southeast and that if the Liberal Democrats implemented the policies in their manifesto it would mean a 27% increase in council tax.

Boundary changes which reduced the number of seats by 1, meant both the Conservatives and Liberal Democrats needed 1 less seat to take control of the council. With the election important to both parties, the Conservative Party Chairman and local MP Theresa May and the Liberal Democrat leader Charles Kennedy both campaigned in the area.

The council again used a mobile polling station to go to railway stations and supermarkets in an attempt to increase turnout.

Election result
The results saw the Liberal Democrats take control of the council, after gaining 13 seats. The election results were seen as giving the Liberal Democrats hope for the next general election in the Maidenhead constituency after the party won 61% of the vote in wards within the constituency against 33.6% for the Conservatives.

Ward results

References

2003 English local elections
2003
2000s in Berkshire